The Office of the Parliamentary Counsel (OPC) is responsible for drafting all government Bills that are introduced to Parliament. Established in 1869, the OPC has been part of various departments and is currently part of the Cabinet Office. Led by Elizabeth Gardiner, the First Parliamentary Counsel and Permanent Secretary, the OPC consists of 60 members of staff, 47 of whom are lawyers and 13 of whom are support staff.  The lawyers who work in the office are referred to as Parliamentary counsel or Parliamentary draftsmen.

History
Bills were originally drafted by normal barristers, Members of Parliament themselves or members of the judiciary. William Pitt was the first person to appoint a dedicated parliamentary draftsman, known as the Parliamentary Counsel to the Treasury, who in 1833 described his duties as "to draw or settle all the Bills that belong to Government in the Department of the Treasury", although he also produced bills for other departments. Despite this many bills continued to be drafted by other members of the bar, and one of these barristers (Henry Thring) suggested that "the subjects of Acts of Parliament, as well as the provisions by which the law is enforced, would admit of being reduced to a certain degree of uniformity; that the proper mode of sifting the materials and of arranging the clauses can be explained; and that the form of expressing the enactments might also be the subject of regulation". In response to this, the Office of the Parliamentary Counsel to the Treasury was established on 8 February 1869, with Thring as Parliamentary Counsel to the Treasury, the head of the office.

The office is small for a government department – in 1901 it consisted of "the Parliamentary Counsel and the Assistant Parliamentary Counsel, with three shorthand writers, an office-keeper, and an office boy". Two more Parliamentary Counsel were appointed in 1914 and 1930 respectively, and by 1960 the office had 16 counsel, along with their support staff. It currently consists of 47 counsel, with a 13-person support team. The OPC was initially part of HM Treasury, but when the Civil Service Department was created in 1969 the OPC became a part of it, changing its name from Office of the Parliamentary Counsel to the Treasury to simply the Office of the Parliamentary Counsel. After the Civil Service Department was dissolved in 1980, the OPC became part of the Cabinet Office.

Duties
The OPC is tasked with drafting all bills of the Parliament of the United Kingdom, and has also been known to draft Orders in Council that are "of exceptional importance or difficulty".

List of First Parliamentary Counsel
Henry Thring, 1st Baron Thring (1869–1886).
Sir Henry Jenkyns (1886–1899).
Sir Courtenay Ilbert (1899–1902).
Sir Mackenzie Dalzell Chalmers (1902–1903).
Sir Arthur Thring (1903–1917).
 Sir Frederick Francis Liddell (1917–1928)
 Sir William Graham-Harrison (1928–1933)
 Sir Maurice Gwyer (1933–1937)
 Sir Granville Ram (1937–1947).
 Sir Alan Ellis (1947–1953).
 Sir John Rowlatt (1953–1956)
 Sir Noël Hutton (1956–1968).
 Sir John Fiennes (1968–1972).
 Sir Anthony Stainton (1972–1977).
 Sir Henry Rowe (1977–1981).
 Sir George Engle (1981–1987)
 Sir Henry de Waal (1987–1991).
 Sir Peter Graham (1991–1994)
 Sir Christopher Jenkins (1994–1999)
 Sir Edward Caldwell (1999–2002)
 Sir Geoffrey Bowman (2002–2006)
 Sir Stephen Laws (2006–2012)
 Sir Richard Heaton (2012–2015)
 Dame Elizabeth Gardiner (2015–)

Second Parliamentary Counsel 

 1869–1886: Sir Henry Jenkyns.
1886–1899: Sir Courtenay Ilbert.
1899–1902: Sir Mackenzie Dalzell Chalmers.
1902–1903: Sir Arthur Thring.
 1903–1917: Sir Frederick Francis Liddell.
 1917–1928: Sir William Graham-Harrison
 1929–1937: Sir Granville Ram.
 1937–1946: Sir John Stainton.
 1947–1953: Sir John Rowlatt
 1953–1956: Sir Noël Hutton.
 1956–1968: Sir John Fiennes.
 1968–1969: Harold Chorley.
 1970–1973: Sir Stanley Krusin.
 1973–1980: Terence Skemp.
 1973–1976: Sir Henry Rowe (jointly).
 1980–1981: Sir George Engle
 1981–1986: Sir Henry De Waal.
 1987–1991: Sir Peter Graham
 1991–1994: Sir Christopher Jenkins
 1994–1996: David Saunders
 The title was then not in use publicly from at least 2000 to Cook's appointment in 2007 (see Civil Service Yearbook).
 2007–present: David Cook

See also
Parliamentary Counsel

References

Bibliography

Geoffrey Bowman, 'Why is there a Parliamentary Counsel Office?' (2005) 26 Statute Law Rev 69–81
Sir Henry Engle, 'The Rise of the Parliamentary Counsel'

External links
Official website

Cabinet Office (United Kingdom)
1869 establishments in the United Kingdom